Cyrano is a musical with a book and lyrics by Anthony Burgess and music by Michael J. Lewis.

Based on Edmond Rostand's classic 1897 play of the same name, it focuses on a love triangle involving the large-nosed poetic Cyrano de Bergerac, his beautiful cousin Roxana, and his classically handsome but inarticulate friend Christian de Neuvillette who, unaware of Cyrano's unrequited passion for Roxana, imposes upon him to provide the romantic words he can use to woo her successfully in mid-17th century Paris.

In the early 1960s, David Merrick had announced plans to produce a musical entitled Cyrano with a score by Leslie Bricusse and Anthony Newley, but nothing came of the project. Burgess had translated the Rostand play for the Guthrie in Minneapolis, and director Michael Langham suggested he adapt it for a musical version. Burgess joined forces with film composer Lewis, replacing dialogue in his play with musical numbers, and the completed work was staged at the Guthrie, again with Langham at the helm.

Following a 6 week tryout in Boston's Colonial Theatre and five previews, the Broadway production, directed and choreographed by Michael Kidd, opened on May 13, 1973 at the Palace Theatre, where it ran for 49 performances. The cast included Christopher Plummer as Cyrano, Leigh Beery as Roxana, and Mark Lamos as Christian, with Tovah Feldshuh making her Broadway debut in two small supporting roles.

Plummer won the Tony for Best Actor in a Musical and Drama Desk Award for Outstanding Performance, and Beery was Tony-nominated for Best Featured Actress in a Musical.

An original cast recording LP was released by A&M Records in 1973. An original cast recording CD was released by Decca Records in 2005.

In September 1994, an abridged version of the musical was staged at The Newport Arts Center in  Orange County, California. Directed by Kent Johnson, and starring John Huntington as Cyrano and Deirdre McGill as Roxanne.  One song, "You Have Made Me Love", released on a Broadway standards album sung by McGill.

Song list

Act I      
Cyrano's Nose - Cyrano
La France, La France - Company
Tell Her - Le Bret and Cyrano
From Now Till Forever - Cyrano & Company
Bergerac - Cyrano & Roxana
Pocapdedious - Cadets
No, Thank You - Cyrano
From Now Till Forever (Reprise) - Cyrano & Christian

Act II      
Roxana - Christian & Company
It's She and It's Me - Christian
You Have Made Me Love - Roxana
Thither, Thother, Thide of Thee - Cyrano
Pocapdedious (Reprise) - Le Bret & Cadets
Paris Cuisine - Cyrano, Le Bret & Cadets
Love Is Not Love - Roxana
Autumn Carol - Roxana & Nuns
I Never Loved You - Cyrano

Original Broadway cast

     
Cyrano de Bergerac - Christopher Plummer
Roxana - Leigh Beery
Christian de Neuvillette - Mark Lamos
Le Bret, Captain of the Gascons - James Blendick
Montfleury, A Romantic Tragedian - Patrick Hines
Count de Guiche, Guardian of Roxana - Louis Turenne
Ragueneau, A Baker and Poet - Arnold Soboloff
Viscount de Valvert - J. Kenneth Campbell
Roxana's Duenna, Sister Marthe - Anita Dangler
Pickpocket, Capucine Monk - Geoff Garland
Jodelet - Michael Goodwin
The Marquis in Red - Alexander Orfaly
Vendor - Tovah Feldshuh
Child in the Bakery - Paul Thompson
|}

Awards and nominations

Original Broadway production

References
Not Since Carrie: Forty Years of Broadway Musical Flops by Ken Mandelbaum, published by St. Martin's Press (1991), pages 191-92

External links
Internet Broadway Database listing
Time magazine review
Cyrano at the Music Theatre International website

1973 musicals
Works based on Cyrano de Bergerac (play)
Broadway musicals
Musicals based on plays
Tony Award-winning musicals